The Bangabandhu Satellite-1 (Bangabandhu-1) is the first Bangladeshi geostationary communications and broadcasting satellite. It is named after the father of the nation, Bangabandhu Sheikh Mujibur Rahman. It was manufactured by Thales Alenia Space and launched on 12 May 2018. The satellite was the first payload launched by a SpaceX Falcon 9 Block 5 launch vehicle.

Background
The project is being implemented by Bangladesh Telecommunication Regulatory Commission (BTRC) working hand-in-hand with US-based Space Partnership International, LLC. The government-owned Bangladesh Satellite Company Limited, BSCL (Formerly known as Bangladesh Communication Satellite Company Limited, BCSCL) was formed with the aim of operating the satellite.

The satellite will expand Ku-band coverage over all of Bangladesh and its nearby waters including the Bay of Bengal, Nepal, Bhutan, Sri Lanka, the Philippines, eastern Indian states (West Bengal, Assam, Meghalaya, Mizoram, Tripura, Nagaland, Arunachal Pradesh) and Indonesia. This is coupled with C-band coverage for all aforementioned areas.

Bangabandhu-1 was initially planned to be launched on an Arianespace Ariane 5 ECA rocket on 16 December 2017 to celebrate the Victory day of Bangladesh. Following the lack of firm guarantee from Arianespace for that date, BTRC instead chose the Falcon 9 launch vehicle. The satellite is now located at the 119.1° East longitude geostationary slot.

Construction
Bangabandhu-1 was designed and manufactured by Thales Alenia Space. The total cost of the satellite was projected to be 248 million US dollars in 2015 (Tk 19.51 billion), financed via a $188.7 million loan from HSBC Holdings plc. The satellite carries a total of 40 Ku-band and C-band transponders with a capacity of 1600 megahertz and a predicted life span to exceed 15 years.

Map of satellite's position

Launch

Bangabandhu Satellite-1 was launched at 20:14 UTC on 12 May 2018, on a SpaceX Falcon 9 launch vehicle at the Kennedy Space Center, USA. It was the first payload to be launched using the new SpaceX Block 5 model of the rocket.

Aborted launch
The satellite was originally planned to launch 10 May 2018. However the rocket carrying the payload triggered an automatic abort as it entered internal power and control at T-58 seconds. The rocket launch was pushed back 24 hours, and it was finally launched on 11 May 2018.

Operation

The satellite uses ground control stations built by Thales Alenia Space with its partner Spectra primary ground station in Gazipur. Secondary ground station is at Betbunia, Rangamati The first test signal after launch was received by the operators on 12 May 2018.

See also

 List of radio stations in Bangladesh
 Mass media in Bangladesh
 Telecommunications in Bangladesh

References

External links

Bangabandhu-1 (BD-1) Communication Satellite - Aerospace-technology.com
 A short documentary on Bangabandhu Satellite-1
 Mission details
 Benefits of Bangabandhu Satellite 1
 Bangabandhu Satellite-1 launch Video
 

2018 in Bangladesh
Spacecraft launched in 2018
Communications satellites in geostationary orbit
Satellites of Bangladesh
SpaceX commercial payloads
Memorials to Sheikh Mujibur Rahman
Telecommunications in Bangladesh
Satellites using the Spacebus bus